A Árvore dos Sexos is a 1977 Brazilian pornochanchada film directed by Silvio de Abreu.

Cast
 Nádia Lippi
 Ney Santanna
 Felipe Carone
 Yolanda Cardoso
 Maria Lúcia Dahl
 Sonia Mamede
 Antônio Petrin
 Virginia Lane

References

External links
 

1977 films
1970s sex comedy films
Brazilian comedy films
Pornochanchada
Films directed by Silvio de Abreu
Sexploitation films
1977 comedy films